Wood River is a  tributary of the Mississippi River, which it joins near East Alton, Illinois, to the northeast of St. Louis, Missouri.

The Wood River is formed by the confluence of its West and East forks. These come together near where they drop down from the Mississippi bluffs. The natural channel of the Wood River used to follow the Mississippi through the bottoms before joining it. This has been cut off by an artificial channel that runs through flood control structures directly to the Mississippi.  In 1803, the Wood River (then known in French as Rivière du Bois), gave its name to Camp Wood, where the Lewis and Clark expedition assembled.

Honeycut Branch is a major tributary of the West Fork, and Girder Branch is a major tributary of the East Fork.

The mouth of the Wood River was a highly industrialized area during much of the 20th century. The Olin Chemical plant produced explosives and munitions for the wars of the last century. This remains as the Winchester ammunition plant. The Wood River petroleum refinery continues to operate on a reduced scale.

Cities, towns and counties
The following cities, towns and villages are in the Wood River watershed:
Alton
Bethalto
East Alton
Wood River
Woodburn

The following Illinois counties are drained in part by the Wood River:
Jersey County
Macoupin County
Madison County

See also
List of Illinois rivers

References

External links
Prairie Rivers Network
Winchester Ammunition Plant, East Alton
Wood River Refinery Museum
Wood River Refinery

Rivers of Illinois
Rivers of Jersey County, Illinois
Rivers of Macoupin County, Illinois
Rivers of Madison County, Illinois